Hsamonghkam or Hsamönghkam (also known as Thamaingkan) was a Shan state in the Myelat region of Burma. Its capital was Aungpan.

Hsamonghkam was established before 1700 CE. During the 18th and 19th centuries it was a tributary of Burma. In 1886, following the fall of the Konbaung dynasty, it submitted to British rule. It became a part of the unified Shan State within Burma in 1947.

Sao Htun Aye, The last myosa of Hsamonghkam, abdicated and surrendered his powers to the Burmese government on 29 April 1959.

References

External links
"Gazetteer of Upper Burma and the Shan states"
The Imperial Gazetteer of India

Shan States